Ade Murkey (born January 29, 1998) is an American professional basketball player who last played for the Stockton Kings of the NBA G League. He played college basketball for the Denver Pioneers.

High school career
Murkey attended St. Croix Lutheran where he led the Crusaders to a 29–3 record as a senior, averaging 22 points, 9.9 rebounds, 4.2 assists and 2.0 steals per game and setting the single season scoring record, while also becoming the school's all-time leader in assists and steals. For this, he was named to the Minnesota AP Boys' Basketball Third Team All-State.

College career
Murkey played college basketball for Denver, seeing action in 118 career games, starting 88, while averaging 10.6 points, 4.0 rebounds and 2.0 assists per game. As a senior, he averaged 18.6 points and 6.3 rebounds per game and was named to the 2020 All-Summit League Second Team. His best game came on February 14, 2020, when he scored a Denver Division I program record 42 points against South Dakota State.

Professional career

Iowa Wolves (2021)
After going undrafted in the 2020 NBA draft, Murkey signed on December 3, 2020, an Exhibit 10 deal with the Minnesota Timberwolves and was waived on December 19, after one preseason appearance. On January 25, 2021, he signed as an affiliate player with the Iowa Wolves of the NBA G League, where he played 13 games and averaged 7.1 points, 2.3 rebounds and 0.9 assists in 21.7 minutes per game.

Stockton Kings (2021)
On October 13, 2021, Murkey signed with the Sacramento Kings, but was waived three days later. He subsequently joined the Stockton Kings on November 2. In 12 games, he averaged 11.8 points, 3.0 rebounds and 1.7 steals per game.

Sacramento Kings (2021–2022)
On December 22, 2021, Murkey signed a 10-day contract with the Sacramento Kings. He made his debut the same day against the Los Angeles Clippers.

Stockton Kings (2022)
On January 1, 2022, Murkey was reacquired and activated by the Stockton Kings after the 10-day contract expired.

Murkey joined the Sacramento Kings for the 2022 NBA Summer League. On October 3, 2022, he re-signed with the Stockton Kings, however, he did not make the final roster.

Career statistics

NBA

|-
| style="text-align:left;"| 
| style="text-align:left;"| Sacramento
| 1 || 0 || 1.0 || — || — || — || .0 || .0 || .0 || .0 || .0
|- class="sortbottom"
| style="text-align:center;" colspan="2"| Career
| 1 || 0 || 1.0 || — || — || — || .0 || .0 || .0 || .0 || .0

Personal life
Murkey is the son of Zayed and Cliff, his stepfather and has one sister, Kai Washington. His stepfather, Cliff, played college basketball at New Mexico State.

References

External links
Denver Pioneers bio
RealGM.com profile
Twitter handle

1998 births
Living people
American men's basketball players
Basketball players from Minneapolis
Denver Pioneers men's basketball players
Iowa Wolves players
Sacramento Kings players
Shooting guards
Stockton Kings players
Undrafted National Basketball Association players